Collège de Saussure is a level 2 secondary school (École de maturité) in , Lancy, Switzerland, near Geneva.

 it has about 1,000 students and 150 teachers.

Notable alumni 
 Didier Queloz
 Julia Steinberger

Notable employees
 Tariq Ramadan

References

External links

  Official website

Secondary schools in Switzerland
Buildings and structures in the canton of Geneva